Hope Valley Historic District may refer to:

in the United States
 Hope Valley Historic District (Durham, North Carolina), listed on the NRHP in North Carolina
 Hope Valley Historic District (Hopkinton, Rhode Island), listed on the NRHP in Rhode Island